The 1965 Valley State Matadors football team represented San Fernando Valley State College—now known as California State University, Northridge—as a member of the California Collegiate Athletic Association (CCAA) during the 1965 NCAA College Division football season. Led by fourth-year head coach Sam Winningham, Valley State compiled an overall record of 1–9 with a mark of 0–4 in conference play, placing last out of six teams in the CCAA. The Matadors played home games at Monroe High School in Sepulveda, California.

Schedule

Team players in the NFL
No Valley State players were selected in the 1966 NFL Draft.

The following finished their college career in 1965, were not drafted, but played in the NFL/AFL.

References

Valley State
Cal State Northridge Matadors football seasons
Valley State Matadors football